This is a list of capital cities, including the legislature or seat of government, of South Korea and its current provinces and provincial-cities.

National capital 

Seoul has been the capital of South Korea since the Division of Korea in 1945. On 20 December 1997 some offices of the national government were move to the Daejeon Government Complex to offset the unbalance developments around Sudogwon. In 2004, former President Roh Moo-hyun purpose plans to move the national capital further away from the Korean Demilitarized Zone. However disputes within the National Assembly and ruling of the Constitutional Court of Korea prevented the relocation. On 2 July 2012 some functions of government have moved to Sejong and became the de facto administrative capital of South Korea.

Provincial capitals

Claimed provincial capitals

References

Korea geography-related lists
South Korea